Loyola School is an American Jesuit high school on the Upper East Side of the Manhattan borough of New York City New York, founded in 1900 by the Society of Jesus.

It is located two city blocks east of Central Park and Museum Mile on 83rd Street and Park Avenue. 

Originally a Catholic boys' school, it became co<educational in 1973, becoming the only Jesuit co-educational college preparatory high school in the tri-state area.

The school has a student enrollment of two hundred, with an average class size of fifteen students.

The Church of St. Ignatius Loyola is in the same complex and is used for various school functions. The church is listed as a New York City landmark and the complex is listed as a National Historic Place. St. Ignatius Loyola School is an elementary school that also shares the complex, but there is no official link between the schools.

History
The Rev. Robert J. Fulton, (1826–1895), eleventh pastor (from 1880) of St. Lawrence O'Toole (the original parish name of the Church of St. Ignatius Loyola), purchased the northwest corner of Park Avenue and 83rd Street (in the Yorkville neighborhood) adjacent to his church. The purchase price was $7,500.00. 

Upon the church's rebuilding and re-dedication, the Society of Jesus strengthened their ties to this parish by founding the school, which was encouraged by the Dominicans at St. Vincent Ferrer and the Paulist Fathers at St. Paul the Apostle. Ground was broken for the new school in February 1899.

The school opened to students in October 1900 with classes held in the nearby priests' residence.

After various building material strikes delayed completion, the six-story Renaissance Revival style steel-framed school opened on December 17, 1900, and was formally dedicated by Michael A. Corrigan, Archbishop of New York, on February 11, 1901.

The New York Herald reviewed the new "Early Renaissance Type" building, reporting that "the building cost about $125,000; and the property, taken with the lot on which it is located, represents an expenditure of over $200,000. The exterior of the building is constructed entirely of Ohio sandstone, with cornices, and a flambeau with coat of arms just over the entrance.... It is of the most advanced fireproof construction.... Altogether the building represents the highest degree of architectural excellence as applied to schools."

The Latin inscription on the first floor chapel bow's blind window panel (with segmental pediment) of the Park Avenue facade reads "SANCT IGNATIO / DE LOYOLA / PATRI LEGIFERO / SOCIETATIS JESV / QVI VBICVMQVE / GENTIVM / IN SPEM RELIGIONIS / ET CIVITATIS / ADOLESCENTES MORIBUS / ET BONIS ARTIBVS / IMBVIT / AEDES HAE / DEDICANTVR" which translates: "To Saint Ignatius Loyola / Founder of the Society of Jesus / who for the good of Church and State / everywhere / has stored the minds of youth / with virtue and learning / these buildings are dedicated."

The chapel was decorated by Brother Francis C. Schroen, S.J. (1857–1924), who had previously been a designer at the Jesuit Georgetown University. The stained glass was by Louis C. Tiffany and above Schroen's white marble altar was a canopied statue of Our Lady of Lourdes by the New York-sculptor Joseph Sibbel.

The six-story gymnasium and rectory at 43–63 East 83rd Street was built in 1953 to designs by architects Eggers & Higgins at a reported cost of $800,000. The five-story extension at 39–41 East 83rd Street was completed by the same architects in 1954 at a reported cost of $290,000.

Notable alumni
 Michael Joseph Armstrong –  vice president, Cantor Fitzgerald; died on September 11, 2001
 Kevin Raymond Crotty – managing director, Sandler O'Neill and Partners; died on September 11, 2001
 Thomas Cullen –  New York City Fire Department firefighter; died on September 11, 2001
 Drea de Matteo –  actress
 Jim Dwyer – Pulitzer Prize-winning journalist
 Neal Finn – second baseman, Brooklyn Dodgers and Philadelphia Phillies
 Wellington Mara –  former owner, New York Giants NFL team
 Joseph Patrick Shea – partner and senior executive managing director, Cantor Fitzgerald; died on September 11, 2001
 Horace Stoneham –  former owner, New York/San Francisco Giants MLB team
 Dan Topping Jr. –  former general manager and vice president, New York Yankees
 Robert F. Wagner Jr. – Mayor of New York City; United States Ambassador to Spain

School administration
Headmasters and principals
         
 William J. Ennis, S.J. (1900–1903)
 James P. Fagan, S.J. (1903–1906)
 Patrick F. O'Gorman, S.J. (1906–1920)
 J.H. Farley, S.J. (1920–1932)
 Frances E. Garner, S.J. (1932–1939)
 Walter A. Reilly, S.J. (1939–1946)
 C. Justin Hanley, S.J. (1946–1949)
 Peter J. Daly, S.J. (1949–1960)
 Robert J. Haskins, S.J. (1960–1968)
 Michael J. Guerra (1968–1982)
 James F. Fox, S.J. (1982–1995)
 Joseph J. Papaj, S.J. (1995–2001)
 Franklin N. Caesar (2001–2004)
 James F.X. Lyness (2004–2014)
 Kristin Ross (2014–2017)

Following Dr. Ross's appointment, the title of "headmaster" was retired and replaced with that of "principal" .
 Adam Lewis (2017–2019)
 James F.X. Lyness (since 2019)

Presidents

 Neil Norbert McKinnon, S.J (1900–1907)
 William O'Brien Pardow, S.J. (1907–1909)
 David W. Hearn, S.J. (1909–1915)
 J. Havens Richards, S.J. (1915–1919) 
 James J. Kilrowy, S.J. (1919–1924)
 Patrick F. O'Gorman, S.J. (1924–1930)
 Edward J. Sweeney, S.J. (1930–1933)
 William J. Devlin, S.J. (1933–1935)
 W. Coleman Nevils, S.J. (1935–1940)
 Francis A. McQuade, S.J. (1940–1945)
 John Edwards Gratton, S.J. (1945–1949)
 C. Justin Hanley, S.J. (1949–1952)
 Robert I. Gannon, S.J. (1952–1958)
 John J. McGinty, S.J. (1958–1960)
 William T. Wood, S.J. (1960–1966)
 Charles T. Taylor, S.J. (1966–1970)
 Robert Haskins, S.J. (1970–1975)
 John Kelly, S.J. (1975–1981)
 James F. Fox, S.J. (1981–1995)
 Joseph J. Papaj, S.J. (1995–2002)
 Stephen Katsouros, S.J. (2002–2011)
 Tony Oroszlany (since 2011)

References

External links
Loyola School

Educational institutions established in 1900
Jesuit high schools in the United States
Roman Catholic secondary schools in Manhattan
Private high schools in Manhattan
1900 establishments in New York City